The 2014 ABN AMRO World Tennis Tournament (or Rotterdam Open) was a men's tennis tournament played on indoor hard courts. It took place at the Rotterdam Ahoy arena in the Dutch city of Rotterdam, between 10 and 16 February 2014. It was the 41st edition of the Rotterdam Open, whose official name is the ABN AMRO World Tennis Tournament. The competition was part of the ATP World Tour 500 series of the 2014 ATP World Tour. Third-seeded Tomáš Berdych won the singles title.

Singles main-draw entrants

Seeds 

 Rankings are as of February 3, 2014.

Other entrants 
The following players received wildcards into the singles main draw:
  Thiemo de Bakker
  Jesse Huta Galung
  Andy Murray
  Igor Sijsling

The following players received entry from the qualifying draw:
  Michael Berrer
  Paul-Henri Mathieu
  Sergiy Stakhovsky
  Dominic Thiem

The following player received entry as a lucky loser:
  Daniel Brands

Withdrawals
Before the tournament
  Jürgen Melzer
  Benoît Paire (left patellar tendon injury)
  Milos Raonic (left foot injury)
  Gilles Simon (back injury)
  Stanislas Wawrinka (leg injury)

Doubles main-draw entrants

Seeds 

 Rankings are as of February 3, 2014.

Other entrants 
The following pairs received wildcards into the doubles main draw:
  Thiemo de Bakker /  Igor Sijsling
  Jesse Huta Galung /  Ross Hutchins

The following pair received entry from the qualifying draw:
  Michael Berrer /  Sergiy Stakhovsky

The following pair received entry as lucky losers:
  James Cerretani /  Adil Shamasdin

Withdrawals
Before the tournament
  Dmitry Tursunov (leg injury)

Finals

Singles 

  Tomáš Berdych defeated  Marin Čilić, 6–4, 6–2

Doubles 

  Michaël Llodra /  Nicolas Mahut defeated  Jean-Julien Rojer /  Horia Tecău, 6–2, 7–6(7–4)

References

External links 
 

 
ABN AMRO World Tennis Tournament
ABN AMRO World Tennis Tournament
ABN AMRO World Tennis Tournament